Edward Thomas may refer to:

Sport
Edward Thomas (gridiron football) (born 1974), American gridiron football player
Edward Thomas (rower), Australian rower at the 1924 Olympics
Edward Thomas (rugby league), rugby league footballer of the 1910s, and 1920s for Wales, Oldham, and Wakefield Trinity
Eddie Thomas (footballer, born 1933) (1933–2003), English footballer with Everton, Blackburn Rovers, Swansea Town and Derby County
Eddie Thomas (footballer, born 1931), English footballer with Southampton
Eddie Thomas (Australian footballer) (1891–1953), Australian rules footballer with Collingwood
Eddie Thomas (boxer) (1926–1997), Welsh boxer
Ed Thomas (1950–2009), American football coach

Writers
Edward Thomas (poet) (1878–1917), Anglo-Welsh poet and journalist
Edward J. Thomas (1869–1958), librarian and author of several books on the history of Buddhism

Military
Edward Thomas (British Army officer) (1915–1999), World War II Military Cross recipient and temporary brigadier
Edward Lloyd Thomas (1825–1898), Confederate American Civil War general
Edward Thomas (British Army soldier) (1884–1939), who fired the first shot of the British Army in World War I

Others
Edward Thomas (planter) (179?–1853), Bajan slave owner and attorney
Edward A. Thomas (1838–1890), Justice of the Territorial Wyoming Supreme Court
Edward B. Thomas (1848–1929), United States district judge
Edward Russell Thomas (1875–1926), American businessman, sportsman and owner of the New York Morning Telegraph
Edward Thomas (antiquarian) (1813–1886), English civil servant of the East India Company
Edward Thomas (character), character from the Disney Channel sitcom That's So Raven
Eddie Kaye Thomas (born 1980), American film, television, and stage actor
E. Donnall Thomas (1920–2012), American physician and winner of the Nobel Prize in Physiology or Medicine
Edward Thomas (MP) (fl. 1625–1629), Member of Parliament (MP) for West Looe
Edward Thomas (police officer) (1919–2015), African-American member of the Houston Police Department
Edward Lloyd Thomas (surveyor) (1785–1852), surveyor in the U.S. state of Georgia
Edward Thomas (physicist), African-American professor at Auburn University

Transportation 
Edward Thomas (locomotive), a steam locomotive on the Talyllyn Railway, Wales, named after the railway's former manager

See also
Eddy Thomas (c.1932–2014), Jamaican dancer, choreographer and dance instructor
Ted Thomas (disambiguation)

Thomas, Edward